The following is a list of the 17 cantons of the Deux-Sèvres department, in France, following the French canton reorganisation which came into effect in March 2015:

 Autize-Égray
 Bressuire
 Celles-sur-Belle
 Cerizay
 Frontenay-Rohan-Rohan
 La Gâtine
 Mauléon
 Melle
 Mignon-et-Boutonne
 Niort-1
 Niort-2
 Niort-3
 Parthenay
 La Plaine Niortaise
 Saint-Maixent-l'École
 Thouars
 Le Val de Thouet

References